Endless Night(s) may refer to:

Music
Endless Nights (album), a 2007 album by Marcos Hernandez
"Endless Night" (Graham Parker song), a 1980 song from new wave musician Graham Parker
"Endless Night" (The Lion King song), a 1997 song from The Lion King
"Endless Night", a song by Shobaleader One featuring Squarepusher from the 2010 album Shobaleader One: d'Demonstrator
"Endless Nights" (song), a 1986 song by Eddie Money
"Endless Nights", a 2017 song by Trivium

Other uses
Endless Night (novel), a 1967 novel by Agatha Christie
Endless Night (1972 film), a British film adaptation
Endless Night (painting), a 1983 painting by Nabil Kanso
The Sandman: Endless Nights, a 2003 graphic novel by Neil Gaiman
Endless Night (2015 film), a Spanish film